SS Wisła was 5.070 DWT bulk carrier that was built in 1928 by Craig, Taylor & Co. Ltd. shipyard, Stockton-on-Tees, United Kingdom for the Polish ship-owner "Żegluga Polska". She was serving for Polish shipowner as a bulk carrier until 1961 and then as a lighter. In December 1975 she was towed to Belgium to be scrapped.

References
 Jerzy Miciński, Księga statków polskich 1918–1945, tom 2, Gdańsk 1997, p. 129-130, 141-173

Bulk carriers
Ships built on the River Tees
1928 ships
Merchant ships of Poland
Maritime incidents in 1931